Tang Mie or Tang Mo (died 301 BC) was a Chinese general during the Warring States period. He was killed at the Battle of Chuisha in modern-day Henan Province leading the armies of Chu against a four-state anti-Chu alliance of Qi, Wei, Han and Qin.

References

Year of birth unknown
301 BC deaths
Zhou dynasty generals
Chu state people